John Franklin Broxholme (11 June 1930 Bradford – 24 June 2000 Bury St Edmunds) was an English thriller writer who published fifteen novels in a little over twenty years (1971–1993) using the pen name of Duncan Kyle.

Reminiscent of the work of Desmond Bagley, Kyle's books typically involve a tough, resourceful individual who unexpectedly becomes involved in danger and intrigue in an exotic setting.  A Cage of Ice, for example, involves a London physician who accompanies a hand-picked team of adventurers on a snowmobile journey across the Arctic to rescue a defecting Soviet scientist.  Green River High follows another group of adventurers into the jungles of Borneo in search of a plane that crashed there during World War II. Kyle's novels are, like those of Bagley and Alistair MacLean, stronger on plot and setting than on characterization.  They are invariably well-crafted, however, and two—The King's Commissar and The Dancing Men—are classics of the historical fiction and historical detective story genres, respectively.

Notable works

A Cage of Ice

In A Cage of Ice, a British doctor living in New York, receives a mystery package addressed to Professor Ed Ward. His name is Doctor Edwards. Upon receiving the parcel, there are attempts on his life. He escapes the murderers and begins to look for Mr. Ed Ward. Soon, he is "kidnapped" by an agent of the US government. He is informed of who Professor Ed Ward is, and is sent on a mission to the Arctic along with an international cast of highly professional personages.

The following is from "New and Noteworthy" by Patricia T. O'Conner; 15 February 1987, The New York Times.

Flight into Fear

John Shaw is a freelance pilot working for the company Airflo. He is told by his boss, John Lennox, to deliver a parcel in San Francisco, and pick up a customer. This passenger is supposed to be kept secret from everybody. Shaw arrives in San Francisco, is kidnapped, and taken to a Chinese restaurant. He meets up with an anti-narcotics agent. Later, Shaw and his passenger evade their pursuers through the San Francisco bay. Eventually, they reach the plane and head to England. Along the way, the aeroplane is hijacked and has numerous malfunctions. Shaw discovers, upon arriving in England, his passenger is not who he thought, and climaxes with a dizzying cat and mouse chase.

The Suvarov Adventure (also released as A Raft of Swords)

The following is from the back of the book.

Terror's Cradle

The following is from the back of the book.

Whiteout (also released as In Deep)

The following is from the summary on the back of the book.

Black Camelot

The following is from "Reviving the Story-Telling Art", Time, 30 October 1978.
 

Stalking Point
From the back of the book:

The Semonov Impulse

This was also written under the pseudonym James Meldrum. From the back of the book:

The King's Commissar

The following is from Seymour Epstein, The New York Times; 20 May 1984.

The Dancing Men

The following is by John Gross, Books of the Times. The New York Times. 22 August, 1986.

The Honey Ant

From the back of the book:

Exit

The following is from the jacket cover:

Bibliography

Novels (as Duncan Kyle)
 A Cage of Ice (1970)
 Flight Into Fear (1972)
 The Suvarov Adventure (1973) paperback title A Raft of Swords
 Terror's Cradle (1974)
 The Semonov Impulse (1975) originally published using pseudonym "James Meldrum"
 In Deep (1976) paperback title Whiteout!
 Black Camelot (1978)
 Green River High (1979)
 Stalking Point (1981)
 The King's Commissar (1983)
 The Dancing Men (1985)
 The Honey Ant (1988)
 Exit (1993)

Novels (as J.F. Broxholme)
 The War Queen (1967)

Short stories
 "The Breathless Hush" – first published in The Rigby File (1989), ed. Tim Heald

Non-fiction (as contributor John Franklin Broxholme)
 The Practice of Journalism (1968)

Non-fiction (uncredited editor)
 Stephen Ward Speaks (1963)

References

External links
Duncan Kyle bibliography
Blog entry about Kyle with biographical information

1930 births
British thriller writers
2000 deaths
20th-century British novelists